Gary/Chicago Airport (also known as Clark Rd.) is a South Shore Line commuter station serving the city of Gary, Indiana. The station is located in the city's Brunswick neighborhood. It is one of three NICTD electric train stations in Gary, and serves the Gary/Chicago International Airport, although it does not provide direct access to the airport. Gary International Airport gives the station as being  from the airport terminal.

The station itself consists of a single platform north of the tracks and one shelter. Passengers on eastbound trains must cross the northbound track to board or alight at this station. The station is a flag stop, and passengers must alert the conductor in advance if they want to get off.  In addition, they must activate a strobe light flag stop signal if they want to get on. 

Parking is available on both sides of the tracks. Access to Gary Airport is available via GPTC Route R1.

Bus connections
GPTC
 Route R1: Lakeshore Connection

References

External links
 NICTD
 South Shore Railfan.net

South Shore Line stations in Indiana
Airport railway stations in the United States
Transportation in Gary, Indiana
Railway stations in Lake County, Indiana